Every year, the European Union chooses to address a subject in order to encourage debate and dialogue within and between member states raising the awareness of European citizens to a specific problem.

History
Beginning in 1983, the European Parliament and the Council of the European Union have chosen an annual theme of action each year, based on a European Commission proposal. European Years are an awareness campaign to educate European citizens and attract the attention of national governments of Member States to a particular issue, in order to change attitudes and behaviours at both the national and European level.

Years

References

External links
 European years (europa.eu)

Calendars
International observances
Cultural lists
European Union